Challenge Gopalakrishna is a 1990 Indian Kannada comedy film directed and written by Om Sai Prakash. The film stars Anant Nag in the title role, along with Ashwini in the leading role. Actor Shashikumar made a brief appearance in a song sequence. The music of the film was composed by Upendra Kumar.

Produced by K. Chidambara Shetty under Chitra Productions banner, the film was released in 1990 and met with positive response from critics and audience. The film was a remake of Telugu film Aha Naa Pellanta.

Cast 
 Ananth Nag as Gopalakrishna
 Ashwini
 Shashikumar in a guest appearance
 Umashree
 Mukhyamantri Chandru
 Sihi Kahi Chandru
 Doddanna
 Girija Lokesh
 Disco Shanti
 Sarika
 Mysore Lokesh
 M. S. Umesh
 R. N. Sudarshan

Soundtrack 
The film's soundtrack was composed by Upendra Kumar.

References 

1990 films
1990s Kannada-language films
Indian romantic comedy films
1990 romantic comedy films
Kannada remakes of Telugu films
Films scored by Upendra Kumar
Films directed by Sai Prakash